Hsieh Yung-yo (born 23 October 1934) is a Taiwanese professional golfer.

Hsieh had great success playing throughout Asia, winning 16 national opens. Most of those victories were on the Far East Circuit, later known as the Asia Golf Circuit, where he was also the circuit champion on four occasions. He also played on the Japan Golf Tour, winning twice.

Professional wins (26)

Japan Golf Tour wins (2)

Japan Golf Tour playoff record (0–2)

Asia Golf Circuit wins (13)
1963 Hong Kong Open
1964 Hong Kong Open
1965 Thailand Open
1967 Taiwan Open
1968 Taiwan Open, Singapore Open
1969 Thailand Open
1970 Singapore Open, Philippine Open
1975 Hong Kong Open
1977 Philippine Open
1978 Hong Kong Open, Taiwan Open

Japanese circuit wins (7) 
 1967 Chunichi Crowns
 1969 Kanto Open
 1970 Kanto Open, Wizard Tournament
 1971 Kanto Open
 1972 Hiroshima Open, World Friendship Tournament

Other Asian wins
this list may be incomplete
1961 Korea Open
1963 Korea Open
1969 Korea Open

Senior wins
1984 ROC PGA Senior Championship, Japan PGA Senior Championship

Team appearances
World Cup (representing Chinese Taipei): 1957, 1958, 1959, 1960, 1961, 1963, 1964, 1965, 1967, 1968, 1969, 1970, 1978

References

External links

Hsieh Yung-yo at the Taiwan PGA official site

Taiwanese male golfers
Japan Golf Tour golfers
1934 births
Living people